Manston Air Base  is a military airbase in Oman, constructed by the British military during the Dhofar Rebellion.

See also
Transport in Oman

References

 OurAirports - Oman
 Manston
 Google Earth

Airports in Oman